Two male athletes from Ecuador competed at the 1996 Summer Paralympics in Atlanta, United States.

See also
Ecuador at the Paralympics
Ecuador at the 1996 Summer Olympics

References 

Nations at the 1996 Summer Paralympics
1996
Summer Paralympics